The San Juan de Micay River is a river of Colombia. It drains into the Pacific Ocean.

The river basin is in the Chocó–Darién moist forests ecoregion, an area of dense tropical rainforest with exceptionally high rainfall.

See also
List of rivers of Colombia

References

Sources

Rivers of Colombia